Westmount Secondary School is secondary school in Hamilton Ontario, Canada. It is a member of the Hamilton-Wentworth District School Board.  The school opened in 1961, and has a 2017-2018 enrolment of 1520 students.

Programs 
The school is a member of the Canadian Coalition of Self-Directed Learning. Westmount also offers gifted classes, special education classes, as well as an ESL program.

Since 1990, Westmount has operated under a self-directed learning program; more commonly referred to as a self-paced environment. This allows students to be able to complete work at their own pace, by enabling them with the abilities to carry over unfinished courses into the next semester, or fast-track them and finish earlier. It is one of the only schools with this program in Canada, and often plays host to international visitors wishing to view the teaching process in person. It is also home to a "sports academy", in which students looking to gain a career in professional sports may hone their skills. Because of the self pacing program, these students are able to be absent from school, without falling behind in their classes. Westmount is also home to a newly instituted Advanced Placement program, and one of Hamilton's best gifted programs. It also has a growing Media Arts and Animation program, and owns a Macintosh computer lab with a separate Macintosh network. Approximately 35% of computers used at Westmount are Apple Mac computers.

Westmount is a multicultural school. The student population consists of a variety of religions and ethnicities. The school is also home to both Christian and Muslim prayer societies, each meeting occasionally to carry out religious tasks.

It is currently the only secondary school in Hamilton to make it into the Fraser Institute's top 100 High Schools in Ontario, ranked at #84 out of 718. In Hamilton, it is well known for its academic excellence and sports academy program

In 2019, its Reach for the Top team – coached by Jay Misuk – became the first team from Hamilton to qualify for the national championship after finishing second at provincials. The Westmount team subsequently won the national title match against a team from Lisgar Collegiate Institute.

Notable alumni
Summer Mortimer Paralympic swimmer and world record holder
Tony Peebles member of Grammy award-winning Pacific Mambo Orchestra
Paul Chafe, author/soldier
Patrick McKenna, actor
Haydain Neale, musician, with Jacksoul (deceased)
Wei Chen, Host, CBC Radio One, Ontario Morning
Jim Witter, Musician
Michael Simoncic, Professional Football Player, Ottawa Rough Riders 1995-1996, Canadian Football League.
Jeffery Croonen, Professional Football Player, CFL 1989 to 1993, 2 Grey Cup wins. Winnipeg Blue Bombers, Edmonton Eskimos, Hamilton Tiger-Cats and Toronto Argonauts.
Bruce Boyko, Professional Football Player, CFL 1990 to 1999, Saskatchewan Roughriders, Winnipeg Blue Bombers and BC Lions.
Allan Boyko, Professional Football Player, CFL 1991 to 1997, Saskatchewan Roughriders & Winnipeg Blue Bombers.
Adam Clarke, musician, Rarity (band)
Evan Woods, musician, Rarity (band)
Andean Medjedovic, mathematician

See also
List of high schools in Ontario

References

Sources

Hamilton Community Foundation. Protecting Our Environment Together (POET): Youth Focus 2004-2005 Grants. Retrieved June 30, 2005.
Fitzgerald, Tony: "Westmount students making waves", The Hamilton Spectator, (23 February 2005)
Eastwood, Joel:"The Spirit of Westmount", The Hamilton Spectator, (17 January 2006)
Welcome, hwdsb.on.ca, Retrieved December 21, 2010.
Simoncic, Michael": 1995 Ottawa Rough Riders season", Wikipedia - C.F.L., (28 May 2012)

External links
Westmount Secondary School
Pulse
Westmount School Profile

High schools in Hamilton, Ontario
Educational institutions established in 1961
1961 establishments in Ontario